Bapi Tutul are a Hindi film singer-songwriter duo consisting of Bapi and his younger brother Tutul. They have written the scores for films such as Sarkar, Sarkar Raj, Khosla Ka Ghosla,  Chal Pichchur Banate Hain , Kajrare , Cabret , The Coffin  Maker , Daughter  of  Mother India   , Sonrise , Antardandwa,  Zor Laga Ke  Haiya, Phoonk,  Runn , James,  Ek Hasina Thi etc.

Early life

Bapi and Tutul are the first ones in their family to settle in Mumbai as they belong to Muzaffarpur, Bihar. Both the brothers have inherited their musical genes from their Mother who was also a music reader in Bihar University while their father was a Sales Professional having worked with various reputed organizations. Bapi and Tutul have acquired graduation in Vocal Music from Prayag Sangeet Music Academy in Allahbad, Uttar Pradesh. Bapi is known for his specialization in guitar while Tutul in piano. They received their musical education primarily from their Mother.

Connection with music 

Bapi and Tutul were hugely influenced by their mother due to her interest in music. Their initial training in Classical Music was given by her. However, the quest to learn western music brought the two brothers to Mumbai. Here, they met Rodrcik Bismark and learned western music from him during 1994 until 1999. During this period, Bapi & Tutul picked up small music assignments like ad jingles and teaching music to students.

Film career
It was only after meeting Bollywood actress Manisha Koirala and Filmmaker Ram Gopal Varma that they got their first break as Music Composers in RGV's 2003 release Bhoot and Ek Hasina Thi. And from then on, they have worked on several movies like Paisa Vasool, Chal Pichchur Banate Hain, Khosla Ka Ghosla, Sarkar and Sarkar Raj

Discography
Pihu (2018)
 Bhor (2016)
Main Khudiram Bose Hun (2016)
    The Coffin Maker (2014)
    Kathputli (Documentary) (2014)
    Daughters of Mother India (Documentary) (2014)
    Dhobi Ki Dulhan Pyari Hai (Post-Production) (2014)
    Chowky (2014)
 Chal Pichchur Banate Hain (2012)
 Bubblegum (2011)
 Rakta Charitra (2010)
   Stations (Short) (2009)
 Zor Lagaa Ke...Haiya! (2009)
 Agyaat (2009) 
 Oh, My God (2009)
    Veer Yodha Prithviraj Chauhan (2008) 
 Sarkar Raj (2008).
 Phoonk (2008)
 Antardwand (2008)
 Khosla Ka Ghosla (2006)
 James (2005)
 Paisa Vasool (2004)
 Ek Hasina Thi (2004)
 Bhoot (2003  )

Marathi movies 

 Sangharsh (Upcoming) (2014)
 Zapatlela 2 (Background Music Score) (2013)
 Ved Lavi Jeeva – (music director)(2012)
 Dubhang – (music director)(2011)

Awards and recognition

Bapi–Tutul were nominated in the Best Background Score Category for 15th Annual Star Screen Awards. This nomination was for 2008 release Phoonk. In 2011, they were awarded with MATA Sanman Awards. The Best Title Track award was given for their composition in Marathi TV Series – Anorakhi Disha. Recently, they won Golden Pegasus at 4th Peloponnesian International Film Festival for The Coffin Maker.

See also
List of composers

References

External links
 Bapi Tutul on IMDB
 Bapi Tutul on Bollywood Hungama 

Indian film score composers
Living people
Indian male film score composers
Year of birth missing (living people)
People from Muzaffarpur